Karolína Plíšková was the defending champion, but lost in the second round to Victoria Azarenka.

Petra Kvitová won the title, defeating Anett Kontaveit in the final, 6–3, 7–6(7–2).

Naomi Osaka retained the WTA no. 1 singles ranking by reaching the quarterfinals. Kvitová was also in contention for the top ranking at the beginning of the tournament.

Seeds
The top four seeds received a bye into the second round.

Draw

Finals

Top half

Bottom half

Qualifying

Seeds

Qualifiers

Lucky losers

Draw

First qualifier

Second qualifier

Third qualifier

Fourth qualifier

References

External Links
 Main Draw
 Qualifying Draw

Porsche Tennis Grand Prix Singles
2019 Singles